James Olson may refer to:

James Olson (actor) (1930–2022), American actor
James Olson (author) (born 1943), American author
James C. Olson (1917–2005), 17th president of the University of Missouri System
James S. Olson, American professor of history at Sam Houston State University
Jim Olson (born 1940), Seattle architect

See also
James Olsen (disambiguation)